José Monteiro may refer to:

 José Monteiro (athlete), Portuguese Paralympic athlete
 José Monteiro (footballer) (born 1982), Guinea-Bissauan footballer
 José Monteiro (volleyball) (born 1991), Portuguese volleyball player
 José Hipólito Monteiro (born 1939), Portuguese marine geologist
 José Luís Monteiro (1848–1942), Portuguese architect
 José Pedro Monteiro (born 1959), Portuguese Olympic windsurfer